

124001–124100 

|-id=075
| 124075 Ketelsen ||  || Dean Ketelsen (born 1953), American optician and amateur astronomer || 
|}

124101–124200 

|-id=104
| 124104 Balcony ||  || Francis Faux (born 1959), a French amateur astronomer known by his nickname "Balcony" || 
|-id=114
| 124114 Bergersen ||  || Thomas Jacob Bergersen (born 1980) is a prolific composer, having scored over one thousand movie soundtracks and film trailers. His music typically has an epic quality. || 
|-id=143
| 124143 Joséluiscorral ||  || José Luis Corral Berruezo (born 1967) worked from 1999 until 2014 as a chef at the Spanish Calar Alto Observatory. Through his culinary skills he contributed significantly to the well-being of his colleagues, visiting astronomers, and the discoverers of this asteroid. He and his food are dearly missed. || 
|-id=192
| 124192 Moletai ||  || The Lithuanian town of Molėtai, home of the Molėtai Astronomical Observatory || 
|}

124201–124300 

|-bgcolor=#f2f2f2
| colspan=4 align=center | 
|}

124301–124400 

|-id=368
| 124368 Nickphoenix ||  || Nick Phoenix (born 1967) is a prolific composer, having scored over one thousand movie soundtracks and film trailers. His music typically has an epic quality. || 
|-id=398
| 124398 Iraklisimonia ||  || Irakli Simonia (born 1961) created the world's first PhD program in archaeoastronomy at Ilia State University where he has pioneered the study of astronomy in ancient Georgia. He is author of more than 80 scientific papers on the history of astronomy, cometary astrophysics, meteorites and Trans-Neptunian Objects. || 
|}

124401–124500 

|-bgcolor=#f2f2f2
| colspan=4 align=center | 
|}

124501–124600 

|-bgcolor=#f2f2f2
| colspan=4 align=center | 
|}

124601–124700 

|-bgcolor=#f2f2f2
| colspan=4 align=center | 
|}

124701–124800 

|-bgcolor=#f2f2f2
| colspan=4 align=center | 
|}

124801–124900 

|-id=844
| 124844 Hirotamasao ||  || Masao Hirota (1930–1997), Japanese amateur astronomer and popularizer of astronomy || 
|-id=845
| 124845 Clinteastwood ||  || Clint Eastwood (born 1930), an American actor, film director, composer, and producer. || 
|}

124901–125000 

|-bgcolor=#f2f2f2
| colspan=4 align=center | 
|}

References 

124001-125000